Thomas Plunket (1785–1839) was an Irish soldier in the British Army's 95th Rifles regiment. He served throughout the Peninsular War and later in the Waterloo Campaign of 1815. He is remembered for killing a French general during the Peninsular War with an extremely long range rifle shot, then killing the general's aide-de-camp, who had gone to his side to render aid, with another.

Early life and Army career
Thomas Plunket was born in 1785 in Newtown, Wexford, Ireland. He joined the 95th Rifles in May 1805. In 1807, he took part in the British invasions of the River Plate (1806–1807). During the 2nd Battle of Buenos Aires, the 95th Rifles were heavily engaged in street-fighting during which Plunket killed around 20 Spanish troops while sniping from a rooftop with others from his unit. They retreated when Spanish artillery bombarded their position with grapeshot. Plunket also shot a Spanish officer, who was waving a white handkerchief with the possible intention of inviting a truce. This resulted in further Spanish artillery bombardment which brought about the British surrender.

Plunket is mainly remembered for a feat at the Battle of Cacabelos during Moore's retreat to Corunna in 1809. Before returning to his own lines he reloaded and shot down Colbert's aide-de-camp, Latour-Maubourg, who had rushed to the aid of the fallen general, which showed that the first shot had not been a fluke. Plunket only just made it back to his own lines before being charged down by a dozen cavalry troopers, but the deaths of the two officers were sufficient to throw the pending French attack into disarray.

Later life
In 1817, Plunket was discharged from the 95th after recovering from the head wound he received at the Battle of Waterloo. Awarded a pension of 6d a day, he soon enlisted back into the army in a line regiment, 41st Foot. The regiment was being inspected by his former commanding officer, General Sir Thomas Sydney Beckwith when the general recognised Plunket and inquired into what had happened to him. He was invited to the officers mess that night and the next day was promoted to corporal, and soon also had his pension raised to one shilling a day with Beckwith's influence. He later renounced his pension in exchange for four years' pay and land in Canada, but he returned to England after a year, considering the land unsuitable.

Plunket and his wife returned to the United Kingdom and, nearly destitute, made a small living as itinerant traders. Plunket died suddenly at Colchester in 1839. Several retired officers in the town heard about the death and recognized his name; as a result, they took up a collection for his widow and paid for his funeral and gravestone.

References

Further reading
 —"Colonel Beckwith [,the 95th CO,] broke the silence, by calling out, 'Private Thomas Plunket, step into the square!' All eyes, it is needless to say, were eagerly fixed upon Plunket, as he halted, with his rifle shouldered, in the finest position of military attention, within a few paces of his Colonel. 'Here, men,' exclaimed the commanding officer, pointing to Plunket, 'here stands a pattern for the battalion!'"

19th-century Irish people
British Army personnel of the Napoleonic Wars
British military snipers
Rifle Brigade soldiers
Year of birth unknown
19th-century Anglicans
Irish soldiers in the British Army
Year of death uncertain
1785 births
Military personnel from County Wexford